Golden City 1 station is a railway station located on the South Main Line in Biñan, Laguna, Philippines. Golden City 1 station does not have platforms but serves well with passengers as a station.

See also
Golden City 2 station in Santa Rosa, Laguna

Philippine National Railways stations
Railway stations in Laguna (province)